Uliaga Island (also spelled Uliagan, Ouliaga, and Ouilliaghui) is the northernmost member of the Islands of the Four Mountains group in the Aleutian Islands of southwestern Alaska. The island's name is probably derived from the Aleut place name ulaĝa, which is itself derived from ulaẍ - "bearberry." No eruptions have been recorded in historical times, though it is thought to have been active at some time during the Holocene Epoch.

History
According to writings by Ivan Popov in the 19th century, the southeastern part of Uliaga was home to a small settlement of "thieving, quarrelsome people" in 1764. This settlement was destroyed by Stephen Golottof, a Russian settler who had made his home on Umnak Island, at the request of the natives of the latter island. Today, the island is uninhabited, though tourists to the Islands of Four Mountains group occasionally visit it by boat.

F/V Tae Woong shipwreck
Although the crew of 49 was quickly rescued by the United States Coast Guard, the ship was too far grounded to be salvageable. The shipwreck had occurred a few weeks before the horned puffin population had returned to the island for the summer, though the leaking fuel could potentially affect the 500,000 to 1 million migratory birds that resided on Chagulak Island,  to the west, if not cleaned up quickly. On May 11, the US Office of Response and Restoration and the ship's South Korean owners declared the vessel a total loss and decided to eliminate the oil slick and the remaining fuel on board by blowing it up with high explosives. They concluded that the other option of transferring the remaining fuel on the ship to another vessel would be impossible due to the hazardous navigational conditions around the island and the time that would be required to implement the plan. The ship was detonated on May 13 and the slick and remaining fuel were successfully eliminated. The wreck was determined to be the result of navigational error.

References

Islands of Four Mountains
Uninhabited islands of Alaska
Islands of Alaska
Islands of Unorganized Borough, Alaska